Robert Geib (2 November 1911 – 8 May 1996) was a Luxembourgian footballer. He competed in the men's tournament at the 1936 Summer Olympics.

References

External links
 
 

1911 births
1996 deaths
Luxembourgian footballers
Luxembourg international footballers
Olympic footballers of Luxembourg
Footballers at the 1936 Summer Olympics
Sportspeople from Luxembourg City
Association football forwards
CA Spora Luxembourg players